The National AIDS Commission of Indonesia ( or Komisi Penanggulangan AIDS Nasional, KPAN) was an independent Indonesian non-structural government agency which was responsible for the prevention and management of AIDS issues in Indonesia. Specialized KPAN organizational structure was effectively dissolved in 2017 while its former secretariat is from then headed by the General Director of Disease Prevention and Control of the Ministry of Health.

History 
The first case of HIV/AIDS in Indonesia was found in Bali in 1987. In the same year, the United Nations General Assembly agreed on the urgency of a global strategy to combat AIDS. The Indonesian government then created a special committee for the management of AIDS and conducted an assessment of HIV positive population through several decrees in 1988 and 1989. KPAN was first formed by Presidential Order 36/1994 as the AIDS Management Commission (Komisi Penanggulangan AIDS, KPA). In 2006, KPA was reformed into the National AIDS Commission of Indonesia by Presidential Order 75/2006 with the formation of its regional commissions.

Programs 
The government mandated KPAN, among others, to create and coordinate policies and activities related to the prevention, control, and management of AIDS in Indonesia, to inform and educate the public about AIDS and to conduct coordination with local and foreign agencies in the prevention and management of AIDS. KPAN was allowed to hire working groups and panel of experts to help its work. KPAN also partnered with local and international non-governmental organizations (NGO). It also supported academic research on HIV/AIDS and published periodical reports.

Dissolution 
Specialized organization of KPAN and its local chapters was dissolved by Presidential Order 124/2016 which also required KPAN to finish its mandate at the end of 2017. This decision was criticized by several who viewed that it was made without listening the opinion of the employees and partners of KPAN and that it was worried that the management of HIV/AIDS in Indonesia would become worse without a designated governmental agency such as KPAN. The dissolution also means that NGOs which had partnership relations with KPAN now have to seek for partnership directly with central or local government which may complicate their tasks in managing HIV/AIDS in Indonesia, particularly for MSM population.

See also 
HIV/AIDS in Indonesia

References

External link 
 Official website , archived copy in Internet Archive

Government of Indonesia
HIV/AIDS in Asia
Medical and health organizations based in Indonesia